Marjatta Hara-Pietilä (née Hara, born 7 June 1951) is a Finnish architect and former freestyle swimmer. She competed in two events at the 1968 Summer Olympics.

References

External links
 

1951 births
Living people
Finnish female freestyle swimmers
Olympic swimmers of Finland
Swimmers at the 1968 Summer Olympics
Swimmers from Helsinki
Finnish architects